The Palo Verde Generating Station is a nuclear power plant located near Tonopah, Arizona, in western Arizona. Palo Verde generates the largest amount of electricity in the United States per year, and has the second largest rated capacity. It is a critical asset to the Southwest, generating approximately 32 million megawatt-hours annually. 

As of 2013, the Palo Verde Generating Station was the largest power plant in the United States by net generation. Its average electric power production is about 3.3 gigawatts (GW), and this power serves about four million people. The Arizona Public Service Company (APS) operates and owns 29.1% of the plant. Its other major owners include the Salt River Project (20.2%), the El Paso Electric Company (15.8%), Southern California Edison (15.8%), PNM Resources (7.5%), the Southern California Public Power Authority (5.9%), and the Los Angeles Department of Water and Power (5.7%). APS was granted a 20-year license extension to operate through 2045 for Unit 1, 2046 for Unit 2, and 2047 for Unit 3, with the option to submit a subsequent license renewal application for extended operation.

The Palo Verde Generating Station is located in the Arizona desert and is the only large nuclear power plant in the world that is not located near a large body of water. The power plant evaporates the water from the treated sewage from several nearby cities and towns to provide the cooling of the steam that it produces.

Description
After a power up-rate, each reactor is now able to produce 1.4 GW of electric power. The usual power production capacity is about 70 to 95 percent of this. This nuclear power plant is a major source of electric power for the densely populated parts of Southern Arizona and Southern California, e.g. the Phoenix, and Tucson, Arizona, Las Vegas, Nevada, Los Angeles, and San Diego, California metropolitan areas.

The Palo Verde Generating Station produces about 35 percent of the electric power that is generated in Arizona. This power plant became fully operational by 1988, and it took twelve years to build and cost about 5.9 billion dollars. This power plant employs about 2,055 full-time employees.

The Palo Verde Generating Station supplied electricity at an operating cost (including fuel and maintenance) of 4.3 cents per kilowatt-hour in 2015. In 2002, Palo Verde supplied electricity at 1.33 cents per kilowatt-hour; that price was cheaper than the cost of coal (2.26 cents per kW·h) or natural gas (4.54 cents per kW·h) in the region, but more expensive than hydroelectric power (0.63 cents per kW·h). Also in 2002, the wholesale value of the electricity produced was 2.5 cents per kW·h. By 2007, the wholesale value of electricity at the Palo Verde Generating Station was 6.33 cents per kW·h.

At the time of its 2011 license renewal, the Arizona Public Service Company noted that since its commissioning, Palo Verde's electricity production had offset the emission of almost 484 million tonnes of carbon dioxide (the equivalent of taking up to 84 million cars off the road for one year); more than 253,000 tonnes of sulfur dioxide; and 618,000 tonnes of nitrogen oxide. The company noted, "If Palo Verde were to cease operation at the end of the original license, replacement cost of natural gas generation—the least expensive alternative—would total $36 billion over the 20-year license renewal period."

Bechtel Power Corporation was the Architect/Engineer/Constructor for the facility initially under the direction of the Arizona Nuclear Power Project (a joint APS/SRP endeavor), later managed exclusively by Arizona Public Service. Edwin E. Van Brunt was the key APS executive in charge of engineering, construction, and early operations of the plant. William G. Bingham was the Bechtel Chief Engineer for the project. Arthur von Boennighausen was one of the Owner's Representatives for Arizona Public Service.

Due to its location in the Arizona desert, Palo Verde is the only nuclear generating facility in the world that is not located adjacent to a large body of above-ground water. The facility evaporates water from the treated sewage of several nearby municipalities to meet its cooling needs. Up to 26 billion US gallons (~100,000,000 m³) of treated water are evaporated each year. This water represents about 25% of the annual overdraft of the Arizona Department of Water Resources Phoenix Active Management Area. At the nuclear plant site, the wastewater is further treated and stored in an  reservoir and a  reservoir for use in the plant's cooling towers.

The nuclear steam supply for each unit was designed and supplied by Combustion Engineering, designated the System 80 standard design–a predecessor of the newer standard System 80+ design. Each primary system originally supplied 3.817 GW of thermal power to the secondary (steam) side of each plant. The design is a so-called 2 × 4, with each of four main reactor coolant pumps circulating more than 60,000 gallons per minute of primary-side water through 2 large steam generators.

The main turbine generators were supplied by General Electric. When installed, they were the largest in the world, capable of generating 1.447 GW of electricity each. They remain the largest 60 Hz turbine generators. Unlike most multi-unit nuclear power plants, each unit at Palo Verde is an independent power plant, sharing only a few minor systems. The reactor containment buildings are some of the largest in the world at about  enclosed.

The facility's design incorporates many features to enhance safety by addressing issues identified earlier in the operation of commercial nuclear reactors. The design is also one of the most spacious internally, providing exceptional room for the conduct of operations and maintenance by the operating staff. 
 
The Palo Verde 500 kV switchyard is a key point in the western states' power grid and is used as a reference point in the pricing of electricity across the southwest United States. Many 500 kV power lines from companies like Southern California Edison and San Diego Gas & Electric send power generated at the plant to Los Angeles and San Diego via Path 46, respectively. In addition, due to both the strategic interconnections of the substation and the large size of the generating station, the Western Electricity Coordinating Council considers a simultaneous loss of 2 of the 3 units the worst-case contingency for system stability.

The owners applied for a construction permit for two additional units in the late 1970s. These units were cancelled for economic-risk reasons before the permits were issued. Contrary to popular belief, the two additional units would not have been on the same arc as the three existing units; instead, they would have been arranged south of Unit 3 on a north–south axis.

The existing units are the only commercial reactors currently in use in the United States that were engineered to operate on 100% MOX fuel cores. Because nuclear fuel is not reprocessed in the United States, the reactors have always operated on fresh UOX fuel.

Electricity Production

Security
Palo Verde was of such strategic importance, due to a variety of its features, that during the Cold War it and Phoenix were documented in war plans of the Soviet Union as target locations in the event of nuclear conflict. In March 2003, National Guard troops were dispatched to protect the site during the launch of the Iraq War amidst fears of a terrorist attack.

The site and the nearby town of Tonopah remain a key focus of work in regard to homeland security, ranking in importance along with Arizona's major cities, military bases, ports of entry, and tourist sites.

As in all nuclear power plants in the United States, security guards working for the utility are armed with rifles.  They check identification and search vehicles entering the plant. Other security measures protect the reactors, including X-ray machines, explosive "sniffers", and heavy guarded turnstiles that require special identification to open.

On 2 November 2007, a pipe with gunpowder residue was found in the bed of a contract worker's pickup truck during normal screening of vehicles. It was then confirmed by the local police to contain explosives. Arizona Public Service then initiated a seven-hour security lockdown of the plant, allowing no one to enter or exit the plant. The site also declared a Notification of Unusual Event, which is the lowest of four Emergency Plan event classifications.

On the nights of September 29 and September 30, 2019, the airspace over the facility was violated by a number of drones. On the first night, five or six drones were reported to be flying around Unit 3, which houses one of the site's reactors. At least four were reported during the second incursion on September 30. Subsequent investigations involved the Nuclear Regulatory Commission, the FBI, the Department of Homeland Security, the Federal Aviation Administration and local law enforcement. However the identity of the operator or operators, and the purpose of the incursions remains unknown.

Safety concerns

In an Arizona Republic article dated February 22, 2007, it was announced that the Institute of Nuclear Power Operations (INPO) had decided to place Palo Verde into Category 4, making it one of the most closely monitored nuclear power plants in the United States. The decision was made after the INPO discovered that electrical relays in a diesel generator did not function during tests in July and September 2006.

The finding came as the "final straw" for INPO, after Palo Verde had several citations over safety concerns and violations over the preceding years, starting with the finding of a 'dry pipe' in the plant's emergency core-cooling system in 2004.

During a March 24, 2009, public meeting, the NRC announced that it cleared the Confirmatory Action Letter (CAL), and has returned Palo Verde to Column 1 on the NRC Action Matrix. The commission's letter stated that "The U.S. Nuclear Regulatory Commission has determined that the Palo Verde Nuclear Generating Station has made sufficient performance improvement that it can reduce its level of inspection oversight." "Performance at Palo Verde has improved substantially and we are adjusting our oversight accordingly," said Elmo E. Collins, NRC's Region IV Administrator. "But we will closely monitor the plant. We are reducing our oversight, but not our vigilance."

To address safety concerns, 58 nuclear sirens were installed within a 10-mile radius of the plant. This area is known to locals as the EPZ (Emergency Planning Zone). The sirens will wail periodically in the event of any nuclear emergency.

History
The selection of the site for Palo Verde was controversial. Critics claim that the site was not the first choice because it was in the middle of the desert, it had little or no water supply, and it had prevailing westerly winds. These would have put the Phoenix-Mesa metropolitan area into jeopardy in the event of a major accident. Critics claimed that that site was selected over alternatives because it was owned by a relative of Keith Turley, a person who received almost two million dollars for the land. Keith Turley was the president of APS, and also a member of the "Phoenix 40".

Units 1 and 2 went into commercial operation in 1986 and Unit 3 in 1988.

On November 18, 2005, the U.S. Nuclear Regulatory Commission announced approval of power up-rates at two of Palo Verde's reactors.  According to the NRC press release, "The power up-rates at each unit, located near Phoenix, Arizona, increases the net generating capacity of the reactors from 1,270 to 1,313, and 1,317 megawatts of electric power respectively, for Units 1 and 3.

On April 21, 2011, the NRC renewed the operating licenses for Palo Verde's three reactors, extending their service lives from forty to sixty years.

Seismic risk
The Nuclear Regulatory Commission's estimate of the risk each year of an earthquake intense enough to cause core damage to the reactor at Palo Verde was 1 in 26,316, ranking it #18 in the nation according to an NRC study published in August 2010.

Surrounding population

The 2010 U.S. population within  of Palo Verde was 4,255, an increase of 132.9 percent in a decade, according to an analysis of U.S. Census data for msnbc.com. The 2010 U.S. population within  was 1,999,858, an increase of 28.6 percent since 2000. Cities within 50 miles include Phoenix (47 miles to city center).

See also

 List of largest power stations in the United States
 Largest nuclear power plants in the United States

Notes

References

External links

U.S Nuclear Plants - Palo VerdeEnergy

Nuclear power plants in Arizona
Nuclear power stations using pressurized water reactors
Buildings and structures in Maricopa County, Arizona
Gila River
Energy in California
Energy infrastructure completed in 1988
Southern California Edison
Arizona Public Service
1986 establishments in Arizona